Michael Collings may refer to:

 Michael R. Collings (born 1947), American poet and literary critic
 Mike Collings (born 1954), New Zealand sport shooter

See also
 Michael Collins (disambiguation)